Baghin may refer to:
 Baghin, Burkina Faso, a town
 Baghin, Iran, a city in Kerman Province, Iran
 Baghin, Hormozgan, Iran, a village
 Baghin, Jiroft, Kerman Province, Iran, a village
 Baghin Rural District, in Kerman Province, Iran

See also
 Baghan (disambiguation)